Șpring is a commune located in Alba County, Transylvania, Romania. It is composed of six villages: Carpen, Carpenii de Sus, Cunța, Drașov, Șpring, and Vingard.

Natives
Septimiu Albini (1861–1919), journalist and political activist 
Gavriil Munteanu (1812–1869), scientist, translator, and one of the founding members of the Romanian Academy

References

Communes in Alba County
Localities in Transylvania